Klubbheads is a team of dance music producers and DJs from the Netherlands. They have more than 40 aliases for their recordings, including Hi_Tack, DJ Disco and Drunkenmunky.

History
Koen Groeneveld (DJ Boozy Woozy) and Addy van der Zwan (Itty Bitty) first worked together in the Turn Up The Bass series of commercial mixes. They started producing music in the 1990s before meeting up with Jan Voermans (Greatski) in 1995. The trio created the sublabel Blue Records for parent Mid-Town Records to release their tracks as Klubbheads. In 1996, they had their first mainstream chart hit with "Klubbhopping", which reached #10 in the UK Singles Chart in May. It was followed up with two other entries into the Top 40, in August 1997 with "Discohopping" (#35) and in August 1998 with "Kickin' Hard" (#36). In 1999 they co-produced "The Launch" for compatriot DJ Jean, reaching #2 in September. At this time they also split up from Blue Records to found the label Digidance.

They scored a Billboard Hot Dance Airplay hit in 2003 with "E" (which samples Eminem's "Without Me") under the Drunkenmunky name. In other countries, it was released under the title "E (As In Eveline)" but the track didn't use the "Without Me" sampling. Their song "Yeah!" samples the crunk hit Yeah! by Usher to a similar success. In 2005 they sampled Rune RK's "Calabria" under the name Dirty Laundry. "Calabria" has been one of the most sampled songs used in the Dance community.

As Hi_Tack, they have released a remix of "Say Say Say" in 2006, a track originally by Paul McCartney and Michael Jackson (now renamed to "Say Say Say (Waiting 4 U)"), which reached #4 in the UK Singles Chart. The track entered the Billboard's Hot Dance Airplay chart in the United States, where it debuted at #18 for the week ending 6 March 2006. They have also remixed Filter Funk's cover of the Police song, "Message in a Bottle".

"Voermans elected to end their partnership in the Spring of 2005 after ten years of collaboration". Groeneveld and van der Zwan continue to work together in a new label, Unit 54, while Voermans remains with Digidance.

Discography

Klubbheads

Drunkenmunky

Hi_Tack

3 Dubbs In A Sleeve
1996 "Volume 1"
1997 "Volume 2"
2000 "Klubbin' And Dubbin' EP"
2000 "Full Dubb Boogie EP"

Bamboo Sessions
2003 "Bamboo Sessions #1"
2004 "Bamboo Sessions #2"
2004 "Bamboo Sessions #3"
2004 "Bamboo Sessions #4"
2005 "Bamboo Sessions #5"

B.I.G.
1997 "The DJ Files 1 EP"
1999 "The DJ Files 2"
2002 "Peak Hour Insanity"
2004 "Break Dance Electric Boogie"

Cab'n'Crew
1998 "Disarm Slidebars EP"
1998 "The Flying Dutchman EP"
1999 "Domestic Turbulence EP"
1999 "Pure (Aviation)/Cab 'N' Pressure"
2000 "Cityhopping"

Code Blue
1996 "Bonkers EP"
1997 "More Bonkers EP"
1998 "Bonkers In Hamburg EP"

Da Klubb Kings
1997 "It's Time 2 Get Funky"
1998 "Don't Stop"
1999 "Everybody Pump It"
2001 "La Di Da Di"
2001 "Let's Go"
2002 "Two Thumbs Up!"
2004 "Neh Neh Oh Neh Neh"
2005 "Welcum To The Good Ol'Days EP"

Da Techno Bohemian
1996 "Bangin' Bass"
1997 "Pump The Bass"
1998 "Bangin' Bass '98"
2002 "Bangin' Wit A Gang Of Instrumentals"
2002 "Droppin' The Instrumentals"
2002 "Pump The Bass 2002"

DJ BoozyWoozy

DJ Disco
1997 "Da Techno Bohemian Presents Dirty Disco Dubs"
1998 "Stamp Your Feet"
1999 "Let's Dance"
1999 "Dirty Disco Dubs 2"
1999 "Reach 2 The Top/Superfreak"
2003 "Get Up"
2005 "Stamp Your Feet (2005 Remixes)"

Greenfield
1995 "No Silence"
1998 "The Wicked Club Sandwich EP"
1998 "Violet Club Sandwich"
1999 "Forever"
2001 "Took Away My Love/The Moment"
2004 "Les Sons D'Amour"
2006 "Test"

Itty Bitty Boozy Woozy/IttyBitty, BoozyWoozy & Greatski
1995 "Tempo Fiesta (Party Time)" (UK chart #34, November 1995)
1997 "Luv Song"
1997 "Pumped Up Funk"

J.A.K.
1999 "I'm Gonna Dis You"
2000 "Everybody In Da Place!"
2001 "The Rap"

Rollercoaster
1997 "Keep It Goin'"
1998 "Keep The Frequency Clear"
1999 "Come With Me"
2001 "Don't Hold Me Back"
2004 "Damn"

Trancemission
1990 "No More Mindgames"
1991 "Trancemission (Rock Da House)"
1992 "The Pollution EP"
1993 "Inner Joy"

The Ultimate Seduction
1992 "The Ultimate Seduction"
1992 "House Nation"
1993 "Ba Da Da Na Na Na"
1994 "Together Forever (You & Me)"
1996 "The Ultimate Seduction/Organ Seduction '96)"
1997 "A Waking Nightmare"
1999 "Get Down And Party"
2001 "The Ultimate Seduction 2001"
2001 "It's Time To Jam"
2004 "The Ultimate Seduction 2004"

Other aliases
1991 "Metamorphism", as KA-22
1991 "Vol. 1", as The Sound Of Now
1992 "Jump A Little Hi-er", as 2 Hi
1993 "I Need You Lovin' (Like The Sunshine)", as Infectious
1993 "Carnival Of Sounds", as KA-22
1993 "Helemaal Cut", as Cut The Cake
1993 "Boom! Bang!", as Frantic Explosion
1993 "Pikke Poeli Mellow", as Hardliners
1994 "Volume 1", as Mellow Tracks
1994 "Volume 2", as Mellow Tracks
1995 "Going Crazy", as Rave Nation (with René van den Berghe)
1995 "The Summer Of Love", as Catalana
1995 "Tossing And Turning", as Chakka Boom Bang
1995 "Dr. Beat", as D-Natural
1995 "I Need You Lovin' (Happy Hardcore And Jungle Mixes)", as Infectious
1996 "Let The Rhythm Set You Free", as Greatski
1996 "Feel My Heartbeat", as Joy
1996 "The Horn", as Digidance
1996 "Guardian Angel", as Chiara (with Dian Senders)
1996 "Everybody On The Floor", as Seven-Tees
1997 "Take Me There", as Maximum
1997 "Nowhere To Run", as Chiara (with Dian Senders)
1997 "Club Fiction EP", as Reservoir Jocks
1997 "Joyride", as Joy
1997 "Get Up Stand Up", as Queer
1997 "Do You Wanna Funk", as Slammer
1998 "Summer Fairytales", as MF-Tracks
1998 "Just Buggin' EP", as Millennium Bug
1999 "Disco Crash EP", as Bad Boy Notorious
1999 "Check This Out!", as Capo Copa
1999 "Showtime", as Greatski
2000 "C'mon Baby", as Clubsquad
2000 "The Russian Roulette", as The Tone Selector
2000 "So Good", as Itty Bitty vs. Stabak (with DJ Stabak)
2001 "Heartbeat", as The Tone Selector
2001 "Welcome To Ibiza", as Al Cappucino
2001 "Dee-Jay", as The DJ
2001 "Sunrise", as Itty Bitty vs. Stabak (with DJ Stabak)
2001 "I Believe In Love", as Cooper
2002 "Hungry For Your Love", as Beat Culture
2002 "I Will Follow You", as Shelley (with Nico Verrips)
2002 "Right Here Waiting", as Lorindo
2003 "Do You Wanna Funk (Remixes)", as Slammer
2003 "I Want You Back", as Cooper
2005 "Can.You_Feel:It", as LCD-J
2005 "B.A.M.", as Tek Team
2005 "Move Your Feet", as Klubbdriver (with Pulsedriver)
2006 "Mama Say Mama Sa", as The Caramel Club
2006 "Direct Dizko", as Club Scene Investigators
2006 "That Once In A Lifetime", as Untouchable 3
2006 "Quadrophonia", as Klubbdriver (with Pulsedriver)
2007 "F***ing Society", as Club Scene Investigators
2007 "Break My Stride", as Dutch Maffia

(Co-)Production for other artists
1995 Paul Elstak - "Don't Leave Me Alone"
1995 Paul Elstak - "Love U More"
1996 Paul Elstak - "Rainbow In The Sky"
1996 Paul Elstak - "Rave On"
1996 Paul Elstak - "The Promised Land"
1996 Paul Elstak - "Get This Place"
1996 Nance - "Big Brother Is Watching You"
1996 Nance - "Kiss It"
1998 DJ Jean - "U Got My Love"
1999 DJ Jean - "The Launch" (with Natasja Morales)
2000 DJ Jean - "Love Come Home" (with Johnny Kelvin)
2001 Kick 'n' Rush - "Party Time"
2001 DJ Jean - "Lift Me Up"
2002 Hula Girl - "Hula All Over The World"
2002 Mad'House - "Holiday" (with Nico Verrips)
2003 Mad'House - "Into The Groove" (with Nico Verrips)
2003 Buse - "Love 2 Nite"
2003 Touriya - "In The Name Of Love" (with Nico Verrips)

Albums
1997 The First... The Best... The Hottest Disco Album in the World... Ever!, as DJ Disco
1998 Kick You Hard
2000 Discofreaks, as DJ Disco
2001 Front to the Back

References

External links
Klubbheads website

Dutch house music groups
Musical groups from Rotterdam
Electronic dance music groups
AM PM Records artists